In situ electron microscopy is an investigatory technique where an electron microscope is used to watch a sample's response to a stimulus  in real time. Due to the nature of the high-energy beam of electrons used to image a sample in an electron microscope, microscopists have long observed that specimens are routinely changed or damaged by the electron beam. Starting in the 1960s, and using  transmission electron microscopes (TEMs), scientists made deliberate attempts to modify materials while the sample was in the specimen chamber, and to capture images through time of the induced damages.

Also in the 1960s, materials scientists using TEMs began to study the response of electron-transparent metal samples to irradiation by the electron beam. This was in order to understand more about metal fatigue during aviation and space flight. The experiments were performed on instruments with high accelerating voltages; the image resolution was low compared to the sub-nanometer resolution available with modern TEMs. 

Improvements in electron microscopy from the 1960s onwards focused on increasing the spatial resolution. This required increased stability for the entire imaging platform, but particularly for the area around the specimen stage. Improved image-capture systems using charge-coupled device cameras and advances in specimen stages coupled with the higher resolution led to creating systems devoted to applying stimuli to samples in specialized holders, and capturing multiple frames or videos of the samples' responses. 

In addition to materials samples, in situ electron microscopy is performed on biological specimens, and is used to conduct experiments involving mechanical, chemical, thermal, and electrical responses. Early experiments mostly used TEMs, because the image is captured in a single frame, whereas the scanning electron microscope must move or scan across the sample while the stimuli is being applied, altering the sample. 

Early problems that limited in situ electron microscopy included mechanical vibration at all scales (from the microscope itself to the sample), and thermal and electrical interference, particularly at the specimen holder. These problems all required fast capture times. However a fast capture time creates an image with a low signal-to-noise ratio, limits the resolution of the image, and also limits the amount of time available for conducting the experiment.

References

Sources
Behar, V.(2005). Applications of a Novel SEM Technique for the Analysis of Hydrated Samples. Microscopy and analysis,19 (4):9-11.
Chai, C. (2012). Graphene liquid cells facilitate electron microscopy studies of nano crystal formation. Nanomaterials and Nanotechnology,4,11-14
Chen, J., Badioli, M.,  Gonzalez,P., Thongrattanasiri,S., Huth, F.,Osmond,J., Spasenovic, M., Centeno, A.,  Pesquera, A., Godignon, P.,  Elorza, A., *Camara,N., de Abajo, F., Hillenbrand, R. & Koppens, F.(2012). Optical nano-imaging of gate-tunable grapheme plasmons. Nature,  487, 77- 81.
Dyab, A.k.F. & Paunov, V.N.(2010). Particle stabilised emulsions studied by WETSEM technique. Soft Matter, 6, 2613–2615.
Ferreira, P.J., Stach, E., and Mitsuishi, K.(2008). “In-situ transmission electron microscopy”, MRS Bulletin,  Volume 33, No.2.
Gileadi, O. & Sabban, A.(2003). Squid sperm to clam eggs: imaging wet samples in a scanning electron microscope. Biol. Bull. 205: 177–179.
Gubta, B. L., & Berriduge, M. J. (1966) A coat of repeating subunit on the cytoplasmic surface of the plasma membrane in the recital papillae of the blowfly calliphora erythrocephala (MEIG), study in situ by electron microscopy. Brief notes. 376–382.  
Han, Z., & Porter, A. E. (2020). In situ Electron Microscopy of Complex Biological and Nanoscale Systems: Challenges and Opportunities. Frontiers in Nanotechnology, 2. doi.org/10.3389/fnano.2020.606253
Ju, L., Geng, B., Horng,B.,  Girit, C., Martin, M., Hao, Z.,  Bechtel,H., Liang, X., Zettl, A., Shen,R.,& Wang,F.(2011). Graphene plasmonics for tunable terahertz metamaterials. Nature Nanotechnol, 6, 630–634 .
Kamari, Y., Cohen, H., Shaish, A., Bitzur, R., Afek,A., Shen,S., Vainshtein, A.,and Harats,D.(2008). Characterisation of atherosclerotic lesions with scanning electron microscopy (SEM) of wet tissue. Diabetes  and  vascular disease  research, 5(1): 44–47.
Katz, A., Bentur,A., and Kovler, K.(2007). A novel system for in-situ observations of early hydration reactions in wet conditions in conventional SEM. Cement and Concrete Research 37, 32–37.
Kolmakova, N. & Kolmakov, A.(2010). Scanning electron microscopy for in situ monitoring of semiconductor-liquid interfacial processes: electron assisted reduction of Ag ions from aqueous solution on the surface of TiO2 rutile nanowire. J. Phys. Chem. 114, 17233–17237.
Stoll, J.D., Kolmakov A. (2012) Electron transparent graphene windows for environmental scanning electron microscopy in liquids and dense gases. Nanotechnology 23, 50, 505704.
Al-Asadi, Ahmed S., Zhang, J., Li, J., Potyrailo, R.A., Kolmakov, A. (2015). Design and Application of Variable Temperature Setup for Scanning Electron Microscopy in Gases and Liquids at Ambient Conditions. Microscopy and Microanalysis 21 (3),765-770.
Liu,  X. H., Wang, J. W., Liu,Y., Zheng, H., Kushima, A., Huang, S., Zhu, T., Mao, S. X., Li, J., Zhang, Sulin, Z., Lu, W., Tour, J. M., & Huang, J. Y. (2012).  In situ transmission electron microscopy of electrochemical lithiation, delithiation and deformation of individual graphene nanoribbons. J, Carbon 50. 3836–3844.
Mao, S., Lu, G., & Chen, J.(2009). Carbon-nanotube-assisted transmission electron microscopy characterization of aerosol nanoparticles. Aerosol Science, 40, 180–184..
Nyska,A, Cummings,C.A.,  Vainshtein,A.,  Nadler, J.,  Ezov,N., Grunfeld,Y.,  Gileadi,O. and  Behar, V.(2004). Electron microscopy of wet tissues: A case study in renal pathology. Toxicologic Pathology, 32:357–363.
Odahara, G., Otani, S., Oshima, C.,  Suzuki, M., Yasue, T. & Koshikawa, T.(2011). In-situ observation of graphene growth on Ni (111). Surface Science 605, 1095–1098.
Petkov,N.(2013). In situ real-time TEM reveals growth, transformation and function in one-dimensional nanoscale materials: from a nanotechnology perspective. J, ISRN Nanotechnology. (2013) 21.
Pocza, J. F., Barna, A., & Barna, B. (1969) Formation processes of vacuum –deposited indium films and thermodynamical properties of submicroscopic particles observed by in situ electron microscopy. J, Vacuum science & technology archives. (6) 4.   
QuantomiX  Ltd. 2005 Quantomix.com domain name is for sale. Inquire now.
Ruach-Nir,I., Zrihan, O., and Tzabari, Y.(2006). A capsule for dynamic in-situ studies of hydration processes by conventional SEM. Microscopy and  Analysis, 20(4):19-21.
Takayanagi, K., Yagi, K., Kobagashi, K. & Honjo, G. (1978) Techniques for routine UHV in situ electron microscopy of growth processes of epitaxial thin films. J, Phys. E: Sci. Instrument. (11) 441–448.
Thiberge, S.(2004). An apparatus for imaging liquids, cells, and other wet samples in the scanning electron microscopy. Rev. Sci. Instrum., 75,2280-2289.
Torres, E. A., & Ramı´rez, A. J. (2011) In situ scanning electron microscopy. J, Science and technology of welding and joining. 16(1)68-78. 
Wei, T., Luo, G., Fan, Z., Zheng, C., Yan, J., Yao, C., Li, W., & Zhang, C. (2009) Preparation of graphene nanosheet/polymer composites using in situ reduction–extractive dispersion. J, Carbon 47. 2290–2299.
Ye,G., Breugel, B., Stroeven, P. (2002) Characterization of the development of microstructure and porosity of cement-based materials by numerical simulation and ESEM image analysis, Materials and Structures 35 (254) : 603–613.
Yuk, J., Park,J., Ercius,P., Kim,K., Hellebusch,J.,Crommie,F., Lee,J.,Zettl,A. & Paul,A. (2013). High-resolution transmission electron microscopy observation of colloidal nanocrystal growth mechanisms using graphene liquid cells. Lawrence Berkeley National Laboratory.

Electron microscopy